is a passenger railway station located in Kawasaki-ku, Kawasaki, Kanagawa Prefecture, Japan, operated by the private railway operator Keikyū.

Lines
Suzukichō Station is served by the Keikyū Daishi Line and is located 2.0 kilometers from the terminus of the line at Keikyū Kawasaki  Station.

Station layout
The station consists of two opposed side platforms connected by an underpass. There are two exits both on the west side of the station; the main exit is on the Kawasaki bound platform, with the Kojimashiden bound platform having a limited exit that is only open during the morning hours.

Platforms

History
Suzukichō Station opened on December 10, 1929 as a station on the Keihin Electric Railway, the predecessor to the current Keihin Electric Express Railway. Initially named  after the adjacent factory operated by the Ajinomoto Corporation, it was renamed to its present name on 20 October 1944, in homage of Saburosuke Suzuki, a founder of Ajinomoto. The station building was renovated in 2010.

Keikyū introduced station numbering to its stations on 21 October 2010; Suzukichō Station was assigned station number KK22.

Passenger statistics
In fiscal 2019, the station was used by an average of 11,229 passengers daily. 

The passenger figures for previous years are as shown below.

Surrounding area
The station serves local factories in the area.

References

External links

 

Railway stations in Kanagawa Prefecture
Railway stations in Japan opened in 1929
Keikyū Daishi Line
Railway stations in Kawasaki, Kanagawa